The International Institute of Information Technology, Bangalore (abbreviated IIIT Bangalore or IIIT-B) is a research university in Bangalore, India. The institute is a registered not-for-profit society funded jointly by the Government of Karnataka and the IT industry under a public-private partnership model. IIIT Bangalore is managed by a Governing Body with Kris Gopalakrishnan, co-founder, Infosys Ltd., as the chairperson.

History
The university was established on 18 September 1998 as the Indian Institute of Information Technology, with its campus at International Tech Park. Professor Sadagopan, who had earlier served at IIT Kanpur and IIM Bangalore became its founding Director. It functioned at that location for four years, and relocated to its present campus in Electronic City in August 2003. On July 4, 2021, at the 21st convocation of the institute, Professor Sadagopan handed over the responsibility of Director of IIIT Bangalore to his long time colleague Professor Debabrata Das.

Administration 
The university is a not-for-profit society registered under the Karnataka Societies Registration Act, 1960. It is governed by a board with S. Gopalakrishnan, co-founder, Infosys as chairman. Other members of the board include Dr. Ajay Kumar, IAS, Defense Secretary, Government of India, ISN Prasad, IAS, Additional Chief Secretary, Government of Karnataka, Prof. Anna Lee Saxenian, Dean, School of Information, University of California at Berkeley (UC Berkeley), and Prof S. Sadagopan, founder director.

Academics
The university offers Integrated MTech [Dual Degree (Btech+Mtech)], Master of Technology (MTech), Master of Science in Research, Doctor of Philosophy (PhD) and MSc (Digital Society) degrees with various specializations. It also offers post-graduate diploma and certificate programs in various specializations.

Rankings
International Institute of Information Technology Bangalore has been ranked 1st among the private technical universities in India as per India Today, August 2021 edition. It has been ranked 8th overall among Engineering universities in August 2021 edition and was ranked 10th in the same category as per India Today, August 2020 edition.

International Institute of Information Technology Bangalore was ranked 62 amongst engineering colleges by the National Institutional Ranking Framework (NIRF) in 2020.

Student life

Student hostels
IIIT Bangalore is a fully residential campus. Most students reside in the student hostels, and are encouraged to do so to fully engage in the extra-curricular activities and academic routine. The campus has 3 hostels in total. Lilavati, the women's hostel, has around 260 single occupancy private rooms, while Bhaskara and Visveswarya are the Men's hostel blocks which have a total of 754 single occupancy private rooms and 76 triple occupancy rooms. The common mess and canteen are located at the ground floor of Bhaskara hostel and is shared by all the students.

Student fests
Infin8 is the annual cultural festival of IIIT Bangalore. First held in 2015, it is a three-day fest which is typically held in January. The fest consists of carnivals, concerts and band performances, competitive gaming arena, singing and dance competitions, League of Fanatics, which is an intense trivia contest and various other cultural activities.

Spandan is the annual intra sports festival of IIIT Bangalore, primarily organised for the alumni to revisit the campus and compete with the current students. The 3-day event receives active participation from the administrative staff and faculty members as well.

Umang is the annual inter sports festival of IIIT Bangalore. The three-day fest attracts students from various colleges in Bangalore.

Alumni
, 3289 alumni have graduated from the institute. IIIT-B has a long list of alumni who have gone on to become successful entrepreneurs and have founded various startups over the years— Intellipaat by Diwakar Chittora, 365Build by Gowthaman Basuvaraj, SearchEnabler by Khadim Batti, Hudooku by Ajay V, Mokean by Kumaran and Murthy are among many noteworthy others.

Innovation
IIIT Bangalore had set up an innovation Centre on 2009 in the campus, Innovation Centre ran first thematic accelerator for startups and have been running one every year since then. Accelerator programs focus on startups that are building on frontier technologies like Mobile Apps, Bots, AI, Conversational Interfaces and Augmented Reality. IIIT-B Innovation day was conducted in March 2021. In this occasion IIIT-B innovation awards were awarded to Greendzine, YoSync, and NP Bridge which were the startups incubated in IIIT-B Innovation center.

References

Engineering colleges in Bangalore
Science and technology in Bangalore
Deemed universities in Karnataka
1999 establishments in Karnataka
Educational institutions established in 1999